Ghar Ki Lakshmi Betiyann (The wealth of the house - daughters) (also known as Betiyann) (International Title:Destiny) is a Hindi language television drama-series that aired on Zee TV. It premiered on 25 September 2006 and was directed by director, Rajan Shahi. The serial ended on 27 August 2009. This serial was produced under the banner of Creative Eye Ltd.

Other versions/telecasts
An Arabic dubbed-version premiered on Zee Alwan under the name "Al Banat Zinat Al Bayt" - girls are the beauty of the house/"البنات زينة البيت", the second season aired on 16 April 2014.

The Show was dubbed In English and aired on Zee World on DSTv channel number 166.

The Show was dubbed In French and aired on Zee Magic on Canal Sat channel number 51.

The Show was dubbed In Indonesian and aired on Zee Bioskop on MNC Vision channel number 23.

Summary
Suryakant Gadodia is married to Savitri and has four daughters - Saraswati, Gauri, Durga, and Lakshmi. He is adamant for a son to continue the family dynasty and inherit the wealth. Savitri's body cannot bear another pregnancy as it becomes weak due to the consistent births year on year so Suryakant marries Menka, who gives birth to Yuvraj. Suryakant abandons and neglects his daughters and first wife whilst spoiling Yuvraj, who grows up insolent and arrogant.

Menka wishes to have sole rights to the household and wealth and wants to get rid of the daughters as soon as possible by getting them married. She arranges Bhavishya Kapadia, an abusive man, to marry Saraswati. Her childhood lover Kshitij saves her when her husband tries to set her alive, and after a long trial, the sisters win the case. Saraswati becomes pregnant after avenging and revealing Bhavishya's truth who is imprisoned, and then marries Kshitij.

The youngest, lively Lakshmi is to wed Satyakam, who also helps find clues against Bhavishya, but he dies, leaving her in a state of shock. She later meets Karan, who has come to the Gadodias to avenge his mother, who was actually harassed by Menka's brother Rasik. She marries him, where after she realises his real intentions of revenge, but insists her dad's innocence to no avail. Karan completes his revenge, leaving Suryakant in mental shock who disappears by falling down a mountain. The family believes he is dead. Laxmi begins to hate Karan at this point as he did not pay need to her when she begged him not to avenge her father. Realising his mistakes, Karan sets on a conquest to find Suryakant alive. He then remarries Lakshmi after she forgives him, but soon dies thereafter due to acknowledging an ancient family secret which, when exposed, bring shockwaves to the Gadodia family. Soon this secret is revealed, disclosing the fact that Menka deceived the family and gave birth to a daughter instead of a son years before. To the family's realisation, they seek their long lost daughter only to find she has been sold to a cat-house in Mumbai and is one of the most sought for prostitute at that place. Jhumki soon begins mingling with the family after defaming them, facing her own hurdles in love and marriage due to her past. Her first encounter is unsuccessful, but she soon meets Nikhil.

Yuvraj by now is trapped by another prostitute Kajri, who he disguises as a traditional woman Pavitra to fool his family and marries. He is greedy and rebukes his mother. The sisters find his secret out, and Suryakant disowns Yuvraj. After accepting Yuvraj into the family once again, Yuvraj devises a plan with Kajri to take all the family wealth which becomes a reality. The property is all on his name where he throws everyone out of Gadodia ‘niwas’ and peacefully lives there with Kajri and the cat-house owner Rasili bai. The daughters give back the rightful property to their father. Eventually, Suryakant pays the price for Yuvraj's mistakes through his demise. Kajri begins to blackmail Yuvraj, at one point, and controls all the family wealth whilst enslaving the family.

As the show ends, Gauri is married to Akash Shah, and Durga marries Bhavishya's lookalike Ranbir Dhawaan, and Saraswati reluctantly accepts the alliance. Laxmi be-weds a mentally disturbed man with a brutal history of violence who soon is cured in Australia. Jhumki who changed her name to Jhanvi marries Nikhil and moves to her husband's home only to face more patriarchal trouble and female oppression at her in-laws, which is eventually overcome with the daughters proving they are equal to men.

Cast 

 Rohini Hattangadi / Nayan Bhatt as Gayatri Garodia(Baa)- Mother of Suryakant.Grandmother of Saraswati,Gauri,Durga,Lakshmi,Yuvraj,and Jhanvi.Great Grandmother of Kiran,Suhana,and Manav.
 Yatin Karyekar as Suryakant Garodia- Son of Gayatri Garodia.Husband of Savitri.Father of Saraswati, Gauri, Durga, Lakshmi, Yuvraj, and Jhanvi.Grandfather of Kiran,Suhana, and Manav.
 Aishwarya Narkar as Savitri Suryakant Garodia- Wife of Suryakant Garodia.Mother of Saraswati, Gauri, Durga, Lakshmi, Yuvraj, and Jhanvi. Grandmother of Kiran, Suhana,and Manav.
 Tanushree Kaushal as Menka Garodia.
 Vikrant Rai / Hemant Thatte as Kshitij Gandhi- Husband of Saraswati.Father of Kiran.Massr of Suhana.Fufr of Manav.
 Kshitee Jog as Saraswati Garodia / Saraswati Bhavishya Kapadia / Saraswati Kshitij Gandhi-Suryakant and Savitri's eldest daughter- eldest sister of Gauri, Durga, Lakshmi, Yuvraj, and Jhanvi.Wife of Kshitij Gandhi.Mother of Kiran.Massi of Suhana.Bua of Manav.
 Neetha Shetty / Aleeza Khan as Gauri Garodia / Gauri Akash Shah -Suryakant and Savitri's second eldest daughter-Younger sister of Saraswati.elder sister of Durga, Lakshmi, Yuvraj, and Jhanvi.Wife of Akash Shah.Massi of Kiran,and Suhana.Bua of Manav.
 Smriti Mohan as Durga Garodia / Durga Ranveer Dhawan-Suryakant and Savitri's third eldest daughter - younger sister of Saraswati,and Gauri.elder sister of Lakshmi, Yuvraj, and Jhanvi.Wife of Ranveer Dhawan.Massi of Kiran,and Suhana.Bua of Manav.
 Twinkle Bajpai / Gunjan Walia as Lakshmi Garodia / Lakshmi Karan Mathur- Suryakant and Savitri's fourth daughter-younger sister of Saraswati, Gauri, and Durga.elder sister of Yuvraj,and Jhanvi.Wife of Karan Muthur. Mother of Suhana.Massi of Kiran.Bua of Manav.
 Romit Raj as Yuvraj Garodia- Suryakant and Savitri's son- Younger brother of Saraswati, Gauri, Durga, and Lakshmi.elder brother of Jhanvi.Husband of Niyati. Father of Manav.Mammu of Kiran,and Suhana.
 Yuvraj Mehra as Puneet Gandhi
 Yuvraj Malhotra as Karan Mathur-Husband of Lakshmi.Father of Suhana.Massr of Kiran.Fufr of Manav.
 Manini Mishra as Chanchal
 Kartik Sabharwal as Ranveer Dhawan-Husband of Durga.Massr of Kiran, and Suhana.Fufr of Manav.
 Shishir Sharma / Sai Ballal as Nekchand Kapadia
 Natasha Rana as Dhara Nekchand Kapadia
 Sid Makkar as Satyakam Kapadia
 Chhavi Mittal as Preeti 
 Jasveer Kaur as Kajri Bai / Pavitra Yuvraj Garodia
 Gulfam Khan as Rasili Bai 
 Nupur Alankar as Halki Bhen 
 Suchitra Bandrekar as Phulki Garodia
 Shekhar Shukla as Hasmukh Bhai
 Rajendra Chawla as Rasik Bhai
 Amit Dolawat as Prince / Dev 
 Niyati Joshi as Niyati Yuvraj Garodia
 Narayani Shastri as Advocate Damini Verma
 Gaurav Chopra as Advocate Kapil Singhania
 Alka Ashlesha as Mrs. Verma (Damini's Mother)
 Soni Singh as Jhumki Rani / Janvi Garodia / Janvi Nikhil Singhania- Suryakant and Savitri's youngest daughter -youngest sister of Saraswati, Gauri, Durga, Lakshmi,and Yuvraj.Wife of Nikhil Singhania.Massi of Kiran, and Suhana.Bua of Manav.
 Yash Pandit as Prakash
 Karan Hukku as Nikhil Singhania-Husband of Jhanvi.Massr of Kiran,and Suhana.Fufr of Manav.
 Jatin Shah as Akash Shah- Husband of Gauri.Massr of Kiran, and Suhana.Fufr of Manav.
 Mahru Sheikh as Devyani Shah
 Nimai Bali as Suraj Pratap Singh

References 

2006 Indian television series debuts
2009 Indian television series endings
Indian television soap operas
Zee TV original programming